No. 535 Squadron RAF was one of the ten Turbinlite nightfighter squadrons of the Royal Air Force during the Second World War.

History
No. 535 Squadron was formed at RAF High Ercall, Shropshire on 2 September 1942, from No. 1456 (Turbinlite) Flight, as part of No. 9 Group RAF in Fighter Command. Instead of operating only Turbinlite and -rudimentary- Airborne Intercept (AI) radar equipped aircraft (Havocs and Bostons) and working together with a normal nightfighter unit, such as in their case No. 257 Squadron RAF while still 1456 Flight, the unit now also flew with their own Hawker Hurricanes. It was disbanded at High Ercall on 25 January 1943, when Turbinlite squadrons were, due to lack of success on their part and the rapid development of AI radar, thought to be superfluous.

Aircraft operated

Squadron bases

Commanding officers

References

Notes

Bibliography

External links
 Squadron.cfm 535 Squadron history on MOD site
 No. 535 Squadron RAF movement and equipment history
 Squadron histories for nos. 521–540 squadron on RafWeb's Air of Authority – A History of RAF Organisation

535 Squadron
Military units and formations established in 1942
Military units and formations disestablished in 1943